Mali competed at the 2012 Summer Olympics held in London, from 27 July to 12 August 2012. This was the nation's twelfth appearance at the Olympics, although not consecutive due to the African boycott of the 1976 Summer Olympics in Montreal.

Malia did not qualify for any of the team events and sent its smallest delegation to the Games to the 2000 Summer Olympics in Sydney. Six Malian athletes, 4 men and 2 women, qualified to the team to compete in 4 sports. Hurdler Rahamatou Drame, who competed at her first Olympic games, was the nation's flag bearer at the opening ceremony.

Mali, however, has yet to win its first ever Olympic medal. Taekwondo jin and double-time world heavyweight champion Daba Modibo Keita missed out of the nation's historic Olympic record, after he withdrew from the bronze medal tournament because of the injuries he had sustained.

Athletics

Men

Women

Judo

Mali has qualified 1 judoka

Swimming

Mali has gained two "Universality places" from the FINA.

Men

Women

Taekwondo

Mali was given a wild card entrant.

References

External links
 
 

Nations at the 2012 Summer Olympics
2012
2012 in Malian sport